Jeremy Ward may refer to:

Jeremy Ward (bassoonist), British classical bassoonist
Jeremy Ward (musician) (1976–2003), sound technician and vocal operator for The Mars Volta and for the dub outfit De Facto
Jeremy Ward (rugby union)  (born 1996), South African rugby union player

See also
Jerry Ward (disambiguation)